The deputy secretary of housing and urban development, in the United States government, is the chief operating officer of the United States Department of Housing and Urban Development. The current deputy secretary is Adrianne Todman, who was sworn in on June 14, 2021.

The deputy secretary is nominated by the President and confirmed by the Senate.

Alfred A. DelliBovi was the first deputy secretary after the title had been changed from under secretary in 1990. The under secretary position was created with the establishment of the Department in 1966.

List of deputy secretaries of housing and urban development

References

Deputy Secretary
Housing and Urban Development